HMS Active was a 36-gun  fifth-rate frigate launched in 1845, becoming a training ship in 1863 and being renamed HMS Tyne and then HMS Durham in 1867. She was captained by Captain Byles in 1879, when members of the crew appeared on stage at the Lyceum Theatre in the play Jack Crawford by James Roland MacLaren.
She was sold in 1908.

References

1845 ships
Fifth-rate frigates of the Royal Navy